The Lenovo IdeaPad Flex is a 2-in-1-laptop line by Lenovo. Unlike the Lenovo IdeaPad Yoga line of devices, the keyboard does not bend back entirely to allow use as a tablet, it is only a dual-mode laptop. Its keyboard rotates behind the display in order to put the device into "stand mode." Stand mode brings the user closer to the screen for watching videos and using touch-enabled apps and removes the visual distraction from the keyboard.

Models

Current lines

IdeaPad Flex 3

IdeaPad Flex 5

IdeaPad Flex 6

Short-living line with two screen options: 14" and 11".

Early lines

IdeaPad Flex 10

The Lenovo IdeaPad Flex 10 is dual-mode laptop with a 10-inch screen. It gets its name from its lid that can fold back flat and then around 300 degrees. 

The 2014's Flex 10's has display features multitouch capability and has a resolution of 1366×768. Buyers can select configurations with the quad-core  (Pentium N3510, or Celeron N2910), or the dual-core (Celeron N2810, or Celeron N2805) Intel CPUs. The Pentium configuration can hold up to 4 gigabytes of RAM and the Celeron configurations can hold 2 gigabytes. The Flex 10 shares the same basic ports and design as the Flex 15 and the IdeaPad A10.

According to a review from NDTV Gadgets, "It's clear that Lenovo allocated most of this device's cost to its more visible features. In terms of functionality, it is best thought of as a modern-day netbook: good enough for surfing the Web, creating basic documents and watching movies now and then, but not suitable for any serious work."

IdeaPad Flex 14

2014's model 
Design and performance - Like other Lenovo devices such as the Yoga, the Flex has a matte, smooth lid that tapers slightly at the sides with a Lenovo logo in the upper left corner. Some models have orange accents, a feature often found in Lenovo's designs. Rubber bumpers prevent the screen from being rotated beyond 300 degrees and prevent the keyboard from contacting the table.

It has a display with a resolution of  1920 x 1080 and ten-point multitouch capability. Models with Intel Core i5 and i7 processors are available. 8 gigabytes of RAM comes standard and up to 16 gigabytes. Storage is available from 256 gigabytes PCIe SSD. An Nvidia GeForce MX130 video card (Nvidia Geforce GT 820 M in the 2014 version)with 2 gigabytes of video RAM is an option. A 0.9 megapixel webcam is included.  802.11 ac Wi-Fi and Bluetooth 4.1 standards are all supported. It comes with a Qualcomm Atheros Internet Card. Ports include HDMI, two USB 3.0 and one USB-C. An SD card reader allows for expandable storage. (Two USB 2 Ports and one USB 3 port with HDMI AND  and SD Card reader were present in the older versions) A 45 watt-hour battery provides up to seven hours of unplugged use. The model with an 8th-gen Intel Core i5-8250U CPU and 8GB of RAM achieved a score of 12,130 points on Geekbench 4.

The Flex 14 runs Windows 10. It includes a Dolby Atmos app, Microsoft Office, McAffe 30 days trial, Lenovo Vantage and such other apps from the Microsoft Store.

Reviews - In a review for Laptop Mag, Shaun Lucas wrote, "The Botton Line: With its speedy performance, strong sound and solid design, the $809 Lenovo IdeaPad Flex 6 is an attractive and affordable 2-in-1. The discrete graphics is another plus, as you can play some mainstream games on this 14-inch convertible (albeit at lower settings). The Flex 6 would be a lot more useful on the go, though, with a brighter screen to fight glare and more battery life."

Overall, this laptop gives an excellent value for money, especially with discrete graphics. Cooling is also great in this laptop as the fan can be distinctly heard when the laptop is put under load. The 1366 by 768 display is alright for watching movies or reading text but not good especially for gaming. The screen brightness is around 300 nitts.

Pros and cons stated in a review in PC MAG:

Pros:

 Innovative hinge design.
 Eight hours battery life.
 10-point touch screen.
 Comfortable keyboard

Cons:

 Screen does not flip all the way around.
 1366 by 768 resolution is low

IdeaPad Flex 2 15

IdeaPad Flex 2 14

See also
 IdeaPad
 Lenovo Yoga

External links
 Official website

References

Flex
Flex
Consumer electronics brands